Events from the year 1664 in England.

Incumbents
 Monarch – Charles II
 Parliament – Cavalier

Events
 12 March – Province of New Jersey becomes an English colony in North America.
 5 April – Passing of the Triennial Parliaments Act.
 May – Parliament passes the Conventicle Act preventing groups of more than five non-followers of the Church of England from assembling (comes into effect 1 July). Jews will be excluded from its operation.
 18 August – England annexes the New Netherland colony in North America, renaming it the Province of New York (after James, Duke of York).
 27 September – Dutch Governor Peter Stuyvesant surrenders New Amsterdam to an English naval squadron commanded by Colonel Richard Nicolls.
 28 October – The "Duke of York and Albany's maritime regiment of foot" is formed in London, origin of the Royal Marines.

Undated
 Robert Holmes's second African expedition to the Guinea coast captures Dutch forts and ships. 
 Construction begins of the Sheldonian Theatre for university ceremonial in Oxford as designed by Christopher Wren.
 Francis Child enters the London goldsmith's business which, as the private banking house of Child & Co., will continue into the 21st century.

Births
 24 January (bapt.) – John Vanbrugh, playwright and architect (died 1726)
 28 February – Thomas Newcomen, inventor (died 1729)
 3 July – James Stanley, 10th Earl of Derby, politician (died 1736)
 21 July – Matthew Prior, poet and diplomat (died 1721)
 3 September – Richard Newport, 2nd Earl of Bradford, peer and politician (died 1723)
 5 September – Charlotte Lee, Countess of Lichfield, née Fitzroy, illegitimate daughter of Charles II (died 1718)
 18 October – George Compton, 4th Earl of Northampton, (died 1727)
 9 November – Henry Wharton, writer (died 1695)
 probable – William Mountfort, actor (died 1692)
 possible – Daniel Purcell, composer (died 1717)

Deaths
 20 January – Isaac Ambrose, diarist (born 1604)
 February – John Hoskins, painter (year of birth unknown)
 28 March – Accepted Frewen, Archbishop of York (born 1588)
 31 March – Charlotte Stanley, Countess of Derby, Royalist (born 1599)
 c. April – John Goodyer, botanist (born 1592)
 7 May – John Tufton, 2nd Earl of Thanet, noble (born 1608)
 22 June – Katherine Philips, poet (born 1631)
 August – John Lisle, Regicide of Charles I (born 1610)
 11 September – John Hutchinson, Roundhead colonel (born 1615)
 8 October – John Boys, Royalist (born 1607)
 Sir Henry Brooke, 1st Baronet, Parliamentary supporter in the English Civil War (year of birth unknown)
 Richard Overton, Leveller pamphleteer (born 1599)

References

 
Years of the 17th century in England